Michael J. Newman (born 1960) is a federal magistrate judge for the United States District Court for the Southern District of Ohio.

Michael Newman may also refer to:
 Michael Newman (product marketer), American product marketer
 Oliver Michael Griffiths Newman (Mike Newman, born 1941), Australian ornithologist

See also
 Michael Neumann (disambiguation)